Kavita Chaudhary is an Indian TV actress, well known for her portrayal of IPS officer Kalyani Singh in Doordarshan series Udaan. She is the younger sister of police officer Kanchan Chaudhary Bhattacharya.

Kavita has also made two more television shows - Your Honour and IPS Diaries.

She was also the famous face of HUL's Surf detergent commercials in India, playing the character of housewife Lalita ji in the ad in late 1980s.

Filmography

Television

References

External links 
 Udaan (Doordarshan) title song on YouTube
 Udaan first episode on YouTube
 Lallita ji in Surf ad on YouTube
 Kavita anchors an episode of IPS Diaries

Indian television actresses
Actresses in Hindi television
Year of birth missing (living people)
Living people